The 2016 Halifax Regional Municipality municipal election was held on October 15, 2016, to elect councillors and a mayor to a four-year term on the Halifax Regional Council, the governing body of the Halifax Regional Municipality. This election was one of many across Nova Scotia as part of the 2016 Nova Scotia municipal elections. School board elections were also on the ballot.

There are 16 districts in the large municipality. On June 8, 2015, the Nova Scotia Utility and Review Board approved new boundaries for four of the districts. Districts 9 and 11 swap an area of new development along Northwest Arm Drive called Long Lake Village. This neighbourhood moves from District 11 to District 9. Similarly, there is an exchange between Districts 13 and 14. A number of properties on Hammonds Plains Road in Lucasville move from District 14 to District 13.

In 2015, two councillors, Barry Dalrymple and Jennifer Watts, announced they would not be re-offering in 2016. Longtime councillor Gloria McCluskey followed suit in February 2016, and in  May another long-serving councillor, Reg Rankin said his current term would be his last.

Candidates and results

Halifax Regional Municipality Mayor

District 1: Waverley - Fall River - Musquodoboit Valley
The incumbent Barry Dalrymple did not re-offer.

District 2: Preston - Porters Lake - Eastern Shore

District 3: Dartmouth South - Eastern Passage

District 4: Cole Harbour - Westphal

District 5: Dartmouth Centre
The incumbent Gloria McCluskey did not reoffer.

District 6: Harbourview - Burnside - Dartmouth East

District 7: Peninsula South - Downtown

District 8: Peninsula North
The incumbent, Jennifer Watts did not re-offer in 2016.

District 9: Peninsula West - Armdale

District 10: Birch Cove - Rockingham - Fairview

District 11: Spryfield - Sambro - Prospect Road

District 12: Timberlea - Beechville - Clayton Park West-Wedgewood
The incumbent Reg Rankin did not re-offer.

wrong math

District 13: Hammonds Plains - St. Margarets

District 14: Upper/Middle Sackville - Beaver Bank

District 15: Lower Sackville

District 16: Bedford - Wentworth

References

External links
HRM Elections

2016
2016 elections in Canada